Monocentris is a genus of pinecone fishes native to the Indian and Pacific Oceans.

Species
There are currently four recognized species in this genus:
 Monocentris chrysadamas (Yo Su, Hsiu-Chin Lin, and Hsuan-Ching Ho, 2022) - diamond pineconefish
 Monocentris japonica (Houttuyn, 1782) - Japanese pineapplefish
 Monocentris neozelanicus (Powell, 1938) - Maori pineconefish
 Monocentris reedi (L. P. Schultz, 1956) - Reed's pineconefish

References

Monocentridae
Marine fish genera
Taxa named by Johann Gottlob Theaenus Schneider
Taxa named by Marcus Elieser Bloch